Gyula Halmay (born 18 August 1910, date of death unknown) was a Hungarian rower. He competed in the men's coxless four at the 1936 Summer Olympics.

References

1910 births
Year of death missing
Hungarian male rowers
Olympic rowers of Hungary
Rowers at the 1936 Summer Olympics
Place of birth missing